Holbrook is an unincorporated community in Greene County, Pennsylvania, United States. Holbrook has a post office, with ZIP code 15341, which opened on June 10, 1869.

References

Unincorporated communities in Greene County, Pennsylvania
Unincorporated communities in Pennsylvania